SS235, SS 235 or SS-235 may refer to:

Military
 USS Shad (SS-235), a Gato-class submarine

Transportation
 Strada statale 235 di Orzinuovi (SS 235), a former Italian state highway